Hydrelia rubraria is a moth in the family Geometridae first described by George Hampson in 1903. It is found in Tibet, China.

References

Moths described in 1903
Asthenini
Moths of Asia